Sawan Biang (สวรรค์เบี่ยง) is a 1970 novel by Krisna Asokesin is about a young innocent woman named Narin who find herself a victim of lecherous stepson of her sister. It was adapted by a movie and four television series.

Plot
When Narin's sister Leela lost her fiancée and was visited by a rich businessman named Worawat who was widower single dad to his son Kawee who was spoiled and ladies' man who happen to be Leela's high school crush. Realizing their loss of loved ones they formed a bond and decided to marry. This caused a shock to her mother and Narin. After their marriage Leela and her family moved to Worawat's mansion except Kawee who hated Leela who replaced his late mother and planned Narin as doll. With his father's death and he tried to kidnap her, but Kawee had another plan – he raped Narin in the night. Silenced by rape Narin decided to leave the mansion and Kawee was kicked out by his father's will now belong to Leela. Kawee was shocked when he saw Narin was pregnant.

Film, TV or theatrical adaptations
 1970 Version - Petchara Chaowarat as Narin and Mitr Chaibancha as Kawee
 1971 Version - Nanthawan Mekyai as Narin and Sayan Chantharawibun as Kawee
 1976 Version - Dueantem Salitul as Narin and Atsawin Rattanapracha as Kawee
 1988 Version - Monrudee Yamaphai as Narin and Yuranant Pamommontri as Kawee
 1998 Version - Suvanant Kongying as Narin and Danuporn Punnakun as Kawee
 2008 Version - Ann Thongprasom as Narin and Theeradej Wongpuapan as Kawee
 2022 Version - Arikantha_Mahaphruekpong as Narin and Toni Rakkaen as Kawee

External links 
 เรื่องย่อ: สวรรค์เบี่ยง
 ละคร สวรรค์เบี่ยง

Thai television soap operas
Thai novels
1980s Thai television series
1990s Thai television series
2000s Thai television series
2020s Thai television series